Universidad Católica de Murcia Club de Fútbol "B" is a Spanish football club based in Murcia. A reserve team of UCAM Murcia CF, it plays in Tercera División – Group 13, holding home games at Estadio El Mayayo, with a capacity of 3,500 spectators.

History
The club was founded under the name of Sangonera La Verde CF, and was bought by UCAM in July 2015. During his first season with the new administration, it achieved promotion to Tercera División after finishing second.

Club names
Sangonera la Verde Club de Fútbol (2013–15)
Sangonera UCAM Club de Fútbol (2015–2016)
UCAM Murcia Club de Fútbol "B" (2016-)

Season to season
As Sangonera La Verde CF

As UCAM Murcia CF B

4 seasons in Tercera División

Current squad

Trophies
Copa Federación de España (Murcia tournament): (1)
2016

References

External links
Official website 
La Preferente team profile 

Football clubs in the Region of Murcia
Sport in Murcia
 
University and college association football clubs in Spain